Okaz is an Arabic Saudi Arabian daily newspaper located in Jeddah. The paper was launched in 1960 and its sister publication is Saudi Gazette. The paper is simultaneously printed in both Riyadh and Jeddah and has offices all over Saudi Arabia. However, the daily mainly serves the provinces of the Hejaz and Asir. As of 2012 Abdullah Saleh Kamel was the chairman of the board of directors of the Okaz Organization for Press and Publication. 
Lawrence Wright of The New Yorker states that Okaz is "like an Arabic version" of the New York Post.

History
Okaz was established in Jeddah in 1960 by Ahmed Abdul Ghafoor Attar and is one of the oldest newspapers in Saudi Arabia. John R. Bradley, in his book Saudi Arabia Exposed: Inside a Kingdom in Crisis, described it as a "downmarket newspaper ... the closest Saudi Arabia has to a yellow press."

Despite Bradley's description, Okaz was originally a cultural weekly based in the Hijaz. In October 1964, it was relaunched as a daily paper.

Its name was used as Okadh in some scientific publications while referring to it. In fact, the paper is named after the popular Okaz market, which was one of the largest open markets during the pre-Islamic era in the Hijaz region. The market inspired the founders of the paper was Suq al Ukaz where eminent poets of the period came together to congregate poems and hold recitation competitions in Taif.

Popularity
Okaz was most popular newspaper in Hijaz at the beginning of the 1990s. In the mid-1980s, the paper was often perceived as a newspaper in decline because of failure to invest. However, it invested in printing facilities and its circulation expanded. In 2009, Okaz is regarded as the most popular paper in the Hijaz and third most popular in Riyadh. Furthermore, Okaz is said to be one of only two major Saudi print media that do not have the member of the Al Saud family among its share-holders. Based on the results of a media survey conducted by research company Ipsos Stat, Okaz is first in readership ratings, beating many other newspapers published in the country. Dubai Press Club states that the paper is mostly preferred by Saudi nationals and younger people.

Circulation
In 2002, Okaz was the largest newspaper in the country. In 2003, it had an estimated circulation of 147,000 copies. Its estimated circulation is reported to be 150,000 in 2009. Dubai Press Club in 2010 reported that Okaz is the most popular Arabic daily paper in the Kingdom with a circulation of 250,000 that was confirmed by the media research.

Global Investment House stated the market share of Okaz as around 6% in 2009.  The circulation of the paper was 250,000 copies in 2010.

The online version of the paper was the 23rd most visited website for 2010 in the MENA region. It was reported by Forbes Middle East in 2011 to be one of top ten online newspapers (specifically the ninth) in the MENA region. In 2012, Okaz'''s online edition was ranked by Forbes Middle East as the sixth in the MENA region with 42.56 million hits, including 12.60 million unique hits.

Political approachOkaz, a paper of Hejaz, is considered to be one of the two leading liberal daily papers in Saudi Arabia. The other one is Al Watan. However, the paper was reported to be close to late Crown Prince Nayef.

Prominent columnists
The newspaper has several well-respected columnists such as Juhair bint Abdallah Al Musa'id and Abdallah Al Jufri. The pioneering deputy chair of the National Society for Human Rights, Al Jawhara bint Mohammed Al Anqari also writes for Okaz. Hussein Shobokshi is among the former columnists of the paper who left it after publishing an article on accountable government.

Content
It appears that Okaz publishes articles and news about several distinct topics ranging from lesbians' confessions to Zionist threats. Besides a critical coverage of social issues, Okaz reports almost taboo subjects, like the harsh treatment of women by the religious police. On the other hand, Okaz was generally considered as the most aggressive and sensationalist about news against Yemen and then-President Saleh. The paper also contains a section on environmental issues.

Hussein Shobokshi, a former columnist for Okaz, wrote about his vision of a country where the government is fully accountable to the public, citizens can freely vote, and women can drive cars in his July 2003 column. His article led to a huge public reaction, including complaints from what he called "tribal and religious groups." Then, he was quickly put in the blacklist for the next year and his new talk show on the Saudi-owned satellite broadcaster Al Arabiya was cancelled. His editor told Shobokshi that he was banned without explaining why or by whom.

Princess Fahda bint Saud, one of King Saud's daughters, published an article on Okaz on 15 November 2003. The article was titled "The Bombings: Who is Behind the Scenes? Who is Behind Terrorism?" and concerned with Zionist threats posed to Saudi Arabia.

In an editorial entitled 'The limits of our responsibility' published in Okaz on  28 November 2003, it was admitted that Saudi money had gone to finance the terrorist acts of 9/11, but added: "It was to be expected that funds have gone out of our pockets and our wealth to those who carried out the act (of 9/11) even though it was done indirectly and without our knowledge."

Two female reporters wrote about a taboo in the context of Saudi Arabia, lesbians, in 2007. They reported the confessions of two women having lesbian relationship.

Muhammad Al Tunisi, who had been serving as editor-in-chief of the paper since October 2008, allowed the publication of a report by Sami Al Harbi about high consumption of the Khat drug plant in Jazan in late November 2011. The report based on a field study claimed that 70% of residents used the Khat plant, affecting the cells of the human body and leading to sexual deviation. This report led to Jazan's residents', particularly young men's, boycott against the newspaper and call for the paper to be banned. Then, Al Tunisi was dismissed by the paper administration, although he apologized and the paper declared that the report had been a scientific study. Then, Al Tunisi was replaced by Hashim Abdo Hashim as editor-in-chief in December 2011.

According to the Okaz'', the murdered Saudi journalist Jamal Khashoggi was a terrorist sympathizer whose sectarian goals were designed to destabilize the Saudi kingdom.

See also

List of newspapers in Saudi Arabia

References

1960 establishments in Saudi Arabia
Arabic-language newspapers
Mass media in Jeddah
Newspapers published in Saudi Arabia
Newspapers established in 1960